Men's water polo at the 2014 Asian Games was held in Dream Park Aquatics Center, Incheon, Korea from 25 September to 1 October 2014.

Squads

Results
All times are Korea Standard Time (UTC+09:00)

Preliminary round

Group A

Group B

Final round

Quarterfinals

Semifinals

Classification 5th–6th place

Bronze medal match

Gold medal match

Final standing

References

External links
Official website

Water polo at the 2014 Asian Games